Jonathan ‘Jono’ Paul Arscott (born 4 July 1970) is an English former cricketer who played for Cambridge University and the combined Oxford and Cambridge Universities between 1990 and 1993. He was born in Tooting and attended Tonbridge School and Magdalene College, Cambridge.  He appeared in 31 first-class matches as a right handed batsman and wicketkeeper. He scored 678 runs with a highest score of 79. He held 30 catches and completed nine stumpings. Whilst at Cambridge he also won Blues for Hockey.

Until September 2018 he taught at Tonbridge School where he coached hockey and cricket and led the Old Tonbridgian Cricket Club. After Tonbridge, he started teaching English at Marlborough College Malaysia,
 where he also serves as Deputy Housemaster of Sheppard House.

Now recently active in Slovakia in education field of Cambridge International school. Learning Slovak a making some friends.

Notes

1970 births
English cricketers
Cambridge University cricketers
Oxford and Cambridge Universities cricketers
Living people